Miguel Moreno (1596–1655) was a Golden Age Spanish poet and writer.

Spanish male writers
1596 births
1655 deaths